Tenglish (), refers to various mixings of the Telugu and English languages.

The name is a portmanteau of the names of the two languages and has been variously composed. The earliest form is Telugish (dating from 1972), then Teluglish (2000), Tinglish (2003), Telenglish (2010), and Telugish and Telish (both 2014).

Distribution
This form of code-switching is more commonly seen in urban and suburban centers of Andhra Pradesh and Telangana, but is slowly spreading into rural and remote areas via television and word of mouth.  Many speakers do not realize that they are incorporating English words into Telugu sentences or Telugu words into English sentences. For example, instead of saying dhanyavadhamulu for "thank you", most people say chala thanks literally translating to "a lot of thanks." This type of Telugu speaking is slowly growing outside of cities like Hyderabad, Vizag, Vijayawada, Khammam, Guntur and Warangal. As English becomes more and more prevalent, it can be seen in small towns, villages, and even rural areas.

With its growing popularity, Tenglish is being used to publish news online. The advent of cable television and its pervasive growth has seen the masses exposed to a wide variety of programming from across the world. Another factor contributing to the spread of Tenglish is the popularity of Tollywood films and TV channels. Tenglish also appears in Indian crossword puzzles, such as those in the Telugu paper Sakshi.

See also
 Hinglish
 Tanglish
 Indian English
 Regional differences and dialects in Indian English

References

Further reading
Krishnamurtisastri Sripada (1866-1960), Mana Sanskriti Issue 86, Vepachedu Educational Foundation

Macaronic forms of English
Telugu language